Kelak (also Romanized as Kelāk or Kalāk) is a village in Abarshiveh Rural District, in the Central District of Damavand County, Tehran Province, Iran. At the 2006 census, its population was 156, in 49 families.

References 

Populated places in Damavand County